This is a list of managers of Tamworth Football Club.

Statistics
''Information correct as of 3 March 2019. Only competitive matches are counted. Wins, losses and draws are results at the final whistle; the results of penalty shoot-outs are not counted.

References
General
Tamworth F.C. Official Website
Tamworth F.C. Heritage Website

Specific

Managers
 
Tamworth